Willcox is a surname. Notable people with the surname include:

Anita Parkhurst Willcox, American artist, feminist and pacifist
 Sir Charles Willcox, South Australian businessman and politician, and a mayor of the City of Adelaide
Cornelis DeWitt Willcox, American soldier and military writer
Louise Collier Willcox (1865-1929), American author, editor, anthologist, translator, suffragist
Mary Alice Willcox, American zoologist
Orlando Bolivar Willcox, American Civil War general
Peter Willcox, American Greenpeace activist
Reece Willcox, Canadian ice hockey player
Sheila Willcox, British equestrian
Spiegle Willcox, American jazz saxophonist
Tim Willcox, British television personality
Thomas Willcox (1689-1779), American colonial-era paper mill owner
Toyah Willcox, British singer and actress
Walter Francis Willcox, American statistician

See also
Wilcock
Wilcox (disambiguation)
Wilcox (surname)
Willcock
Willcocks
Willock
Wilcoxon

English-language surnames
Patronymic surnames